Wat Tyler Cluverius IV (December 4, 1934 – February 14, 2010) was an American diplomat with a focus on the Middle East.

Cluverius was born in Arlington, Massachusetts and grew up in Chicago, Illinois. Cluverius married the former Leah Konstabler. Cluverius was a veteran of the United States Navy, serving from 1957 to 1962. He received a master's degree from Indiana University Bloomington in 1967. He was a fourth-generation member of the navy, and his daughter, Charlotte Cluverius, is a naval officer.

Cluverius joined the United States Department of State in the 1967. He served as U.S. Ambassador to Bahrain from 1976 to 1978. He also served as a deputy assistant secretary of state during the presidency of Ronald Reagan. According to then U.S. Secretary of State George Shultz, Cluverius was "a man to whom King Hussein talked easily and whom we therefore sent to Jordan at critical times." He also served as Consul General in Jerusalem from 1983 to 1985. From 1988 to 1998, he served as Director-General of the Multinational Force and Observers. From 2002 to 2007, he was the president and chief executive officer of the Cleveland Council on World Affairs.

Cluverius was survived by his wife, Leah, son, Wat T. Cluverius V, daughter Charlotte, and two stepsons.

References

External links

1934 births
2010 deaths
Ambassadors of the United States to Bahrain
People from Chicago
People from Arlington, Massachusetts
People from Shaker Heights, Ohio
Indiana University Bloomington alumni
Military personnel from Massachusetts
United States Foreign Service personnel
20th-century American diplomats